Rafiqul Islam Bakul Bangladesh Nationalist Party politician. He was elected a member of parliament for Pabna-5 in 1986, February 1996 and June 1996. He was an organizer of the Liberation War of Bangladesh.

Career 
Rafiqul Islam Bakul was elected to parliament from Pabna-5 as a Bangladesh Awami League candidate in 1986 election. He was elected a member of parliament for Pabna-5 as a Bangladesh Nationalist Party candidate in February 1996 and June 1996 election.

Death 
Rafiqul Islam Bakul died in a road accident at Konabari in Sirajganj on 10 November 2000.

References 

2000 deaths
Awami League politicians
Bangladesh Nationalist Party politicians
People from Pabna District
Pabna Edward College alumni